The 2017–18 Kosovar Cup was the football knockout competition of Kosovo in the 2017–18 season.

First round
The draw for the first round was held on 16 October 2017.

Results:

Second round
The draw for the second round was held on 16 October 2017.

Results:

Third round
The draw for the third round was held on 7 November 2017.

Results:

Fourth round
The draw for the fourth round was held on 8 December 2017.

Quarter-finals

The draw for the fifth round was held on 16 February 2018. Drenica will qualify direct to Semi-Final.

Semi-finals

These matches will be played on 4 and 18 April 2018.

First leg

Second leg

Final

The final of this year's Kosovo Cup was held on 27 May 2018.

References

Kosovar Cup seasons
Kosovo
Cup